María Azul Rossetti (born 9 August 1995) is an Argentinian field hockey goalkeeper.

Hockey career 
Rossetti was part of the Argentina Junior National Team at the 2016 Junior World Cup where the team won the gold medal, defeating the Netherlands in the final.

In 2018, Rossetti took part of the team that won the 2018 South American Games.

References

1995 births
Living people
Las Leonas players
Argentine female field hockey players
Field hockey players from Buenos Aires
South American Games medalists in field hockey
South American Games gold medalists for Argentina
21st-century Argentine women